Thieves Like Us is a multinational Electronic music band led by vocalist and guitarist Andy Grier, with a fluid lineup of members ranging from Berlin to the UK and Scandinavia.

The band's music has often featured heavy use of electronic elements but is also influenced by the krautrock, Italo disco, glam punk, French touch and hip-hop genres. Thieves Like Us consider themselves a pop group. The band are noted for their strict branding, with all releases following the same format for their covers and associated music videos, the latter created personally by Andy Grier by chopping up films from 1970s European cinema to impressionistic effect.

In its early days the band was a trio consisting of Andy Grier (vocals), and Swedish musicians Pontus Berghe (drums) and Björn Berglund (keyboards), who met the American Grier in Berlin's Mauerpark in 2002. They started DJing together and eventually began producing their own electronic music. After several years self-producing (including the release of the instrumental and semi-ambient "Berlin, Alex") they were discovered by the French imprint Kitsuné who released their first commercial single, "Drugs In My Body", in 2007.

2008's "Play Music", their second album, was released under Shelflife Records and was recorded in Berlin, London, New York City and Stockholm given the band members were spread across multiple continents. Their third album, "Again And Again", featuring popular track Never Known Love, was released in 2010. After moving labels to Captured Tracks, "Berlin, Alex" was reissued (stylised as "Berlin Alex", and with a different cover) and the band begun work on their fourth album, Bleed Bleed Bleed, a darker and somewhat political album with less of the electronica influence of their earlier work. It was at this point that backing vocalists Martine Duverglas and Anna De Marco, and drummer Dani Imhoff, were added to the lineup, with Duverglas taking an equal role alongside Grier on vocal duties on this fourth album.

Existential conflict within the trio and weak marketing by the label (alleged by Grier) upon the album's release in 2012 led to poor sales and both Berghe and Berglund left, leading to a hasty tour staffed mostly by session musicians. After writing several more songs the next year Grier recruited the British Thomas Franklin from the Berlin bar 'Sameheads' where Grier was working as a bartender and Berliner Tore Knipping through a friend, before touring extensively with the new material and heading back in the studio to record the self-titled Thieves Like Us, which was released in January 2017 to positive comments from Pitchfork and Consequence Of Sound. This was preceded by a cover of Blood Orange's "Sutphin Boulevard" and an accompanying video. The band have consistently received mixed critical reviews while retaining an intense cult status in Europe and Latin America.

Members
Andy Grier – vocals, guitar
Chris Wackrow – guitar
Ramona Strummer – synthesizer
Thomas Franklin – bass guitar
Tore Knipping – drums
Martine Duverglas – backing vocals
Mia Von Matt – backing vocals
Monika Martinez – backing vocals

Past members
Björn Berglund – synthesizer
Pontus Berghe – drums
Dani Imhoff – drums
Annie De Marco – backing vocals

Discography

Albums
Berlin, Alex (2007), self-released
Play Music (2008), Shelflife/Seayou Records
Again And Again (2010), Shelflife/DeBonton
Bleed Bleed Bleed (2012), Captured Tracks
Thieves Like Us (2017), Seayou Records

Singles, EPs
"Drugs In My Body/Fass" 12" (2007), Kitsuné
"Your Heart Feels" 12" (2008), Seayou
"Really Like To See You Again" 12" (2009), Shelflife
"Shyness" 12" (2010),  Kitsune  
"One Night With You" 12" (2010),  Kitsune 
"Your Love Runs Still" EP (2011), Captured Tracks

Music videos (often given to tracks released as singles for radio play) 
 "Drugs In My Body" (2007)
 "Headlong Into Night" (2008)
 "Program Of The First Part (2009)
 "Desire" (2009)
 "Your Heart Feels" (2010)
 "Never Known Love (2010)
 "Forget Me Not" (2011)
 "Lover Lover" (2012)
 "Your Love Runs Still" (2012)
 "Stay Blue" (2013)
 "Maria Marie" (2013)
 "Sutphin Boulevard" (2015)
 "Jennifer" (2016)
 "Broken Mirror" (2017)

References

External links
Official biography

Thieves Like Us Interview

Musical groups established in 2002
German musical trios
2002 establishments in Germany
Kitsuné artists
Captured Tracks artists